is a passenger railway station located in the city of Ōtsu, Shiga Prefecture, Japan, operated by the West Japan Railway Company (JR West).

Lines

Station layout
The station consists of two elevated island platforms with the station building underneath. The station is staffed.

Platforms

Adjacent Stations

History
The station became part of the West Japan Railway Company on 1 April 1987 due to the privatization and dissolution of the JNR. The station name was renamed to the present name on 15 March 2008.

Station numbering was introduced in March 2018 with Ogoto-onsen being assigned station number JR-B26.

Passenger statistics
In fiscal 2019, the station was used by an average of 6,313 passengers daily (boarding passengers only).

Surrounding area
 Otsu City Ogoto Elementary School
 Japan National Route 161 
 Ogoto Shrine
 Ogoto Onsen

See also
List of railway stations in Japan

References

External links

JR West official home page

Railway stations in Japan opened in 1974
Kosei Line
Railway stations in Shiga Prefecture
Railway stations in Ōtsu